White ring may refer to:

 a ring with a white gemstone
 White Ring arena, sports arena in Japan
 White power ring ("White Ring") of the White Lantern Corps
 Nenya, the White Ring, one of the Three Rings of Elven Kings under the Sky
 White Ring, a German male Catholic student fraternity
 White Ring (band) 
 The White Ring (ski circuit), ski circuit in Austria